Bruno Mars at Park MGM is a concert residency held at the Park Theater, Park MGM in Las Vegas and The Theater at MGM National Harbor, Oxon Hill in Maryland by American singer and songwriter Bruno Mars. Both venues are located in the United States. The setlist, which featured songs from Doo-Wops & Hooligans (2010), Unorthodox Jukebox (2012), 24K Magic (2016) and various covers, was performed by Mars, backed by his eight-piece band, The Hooligans. The concert residency was promoted by Live Nation and MGM Resorts, lasted eight years and grossed $53,2 million. It attracted a wide-ranging audience of all age groups. The April 2020 dates were canceled due to the COVID-19 pandemic. The residency won Top R&B Tour at the 2022 Billboard Music Awards.

Background and development
On October 10, 2016, Entertainment Tonight announced that Bruno Mars signed a two-year deal with MGM Resorts International to perform at the Park Theater at Monte Carlo, in Las Vegas and The Theater at MGM National Harbor, in Maryland. This was Mars second concert residency, after performing at The Chelsea at The Cosmopolitan with the last show being 2015 New Year's Eve. The president of MGM Resorts International, Bill Hornbuckle, said "There is no stronger launching pad for a new venue than for Mars to be among the first to grace its stage". The singer was among first to perform at the MGM National Harbor, as well as the first to perform at the new Park Theater, which features 5,300 seats, as well as brand new audio and visual technology. The concert residency was promoted by Live Nation and occasionally by MGM Resorts.

Extra show dates for May and June 2023 were later added to the lineup.

Shows cancellation and rescheduled
The Las Vegas Review-Journal reported that Mars avoid contact the fans on his shows on March 6 and 7, 2020, at the Park Theater, as a response to the COVID-19 pandemic. Moreover, MGM Resorts announced the cancellation of the dates at the Park Theater on April 20, 24, and 25 due to the COVID-19 pandemic. On April 26, 2021, Mars was announced to return to the Park MGM to perform concerts at Park Theater beginning on the fourth of July weekend. The scheduled shows sold within hours after being announced. On July 22, 2021, Mars postponed his July 23 and 24 shows to August 27 and 28 due to "unforeseen circumstances", according to a spokesperson for MGM Resorts.

Concert synopsis
The concert, which had a runtime of 90 to 95 minutes, opened either with "24K Magic" or "Finesse". During the show, Mars split the fans in half "to see who was loudest". During the concert "Runaway Baby" was interluded with The Isley Brothers' "Shout", and as Mars sung "A little bit softer now..." he and his band fell to the ground, only to rise up again closing the track. There was also a mash-up of Barrett Strong's "Money (That's What I Want)" and Travie McCoy's featuring Mars "Billionaire". At one point he asked the crowd if they could not look at their phones for a while. He also covered "Pony" by Ginuwine and gave "Grenade" a guitar solo transforming it into a rock song. Mars sung alone on the stage, along with the crowd, the ballad "When I Was Your Man". Afterwards, his band came back to perform "Locked Out of Heaven" and "Just the Way You Are" with him. The show closed with an encore of "Uptown Funk". The concert included fire cannons and a "giant sign spelling out" Bruno Mars. During the New Year's Eve show as the performance of "Locked Out of Heaven" came to an end, "the power went out onstage".

At these shows, Mars performed a medley of various covers that would vary according to dates and fan suggestions. During the New Year's Eve show, he sung portions of Celine Dion's "My Heart Will Go On", Queen's "We Will Rock You" and "Another One Bites the Dust", "Hollaback Girl" by Gwen Stefani, the Backstreet Boys' "I Want It That Way", The Beatles' chorus "Hey Jude" from the Cirque du Soleil's Love tribute show at The Mirage in Las Vegas, and "Isn't She Lovely" by Stevie Wonder. In another show, on February 19, 2018, Mars performed covers of songs by Ginuwine, Janet Jackson, Bobby Brown, Soul for Real's "Candy Rain", as well as portions of "My Cherie Amour" by Steve Wonder, Lauryn Hill's "Doo Wop (That Thing)" and a full version of Prince's "Let's Go Crazy".

Reception
The residency received positive reviews from critics. Mike Weatherford from Las Vegas Review-Journal, while reviewing Mars' 2017 New Years concert, noticed the wide range of people's age and stated "If the casinos could genetically engineer the perfect entertainment machine, Mars is it." Weatherford gave the show an A rating. Writing for the same publication, John Katsilometes dubbed the performance as "extraordinary" and "classic". Las Vegas Weeklys Brock Radke also noticed the wide range of people's age and added, "the modern age of Vegas entertainment hasn't had a hotter, more relevant regular than Bruno Mars". As of August 27, 2021, Billboard Boxscore reported that Mars has grossed $53.2 million and sold 201,000 tickets after playing 36 shows at the Park Theater in Vegas and other five at The Theater at MGM National Harbor in Oxon Hil. His theater residency is the highest grossing in the MGM franchise at $56.2 million. The residency won Top R&B Tour at the 2022 Billboard Music Awards.

Shows

Canceled shows

References

2016 concert residencies
2017 concert residencies
2018 concert residencies
2019 concert residencies
2020 concert residencies
Music events cancelled due to the COVID-19 pandemic
Concert residencies in the Las Vegas Valley
Bruno Mars
Park MGM
2021 concert residencies